Shogun Warriors may refer to:

Shogun Warriors (toys), a line of toy robots
Shogun Warriors (comics), a Marvel Comics series based on the toys
Shogun Warriors (video game), a fighting game by Kaneko, prequel to Blood Warrior